The Royal Australian Air Force's Aircraft Research and Development Unit (ARDU) plans, conducts and analyses the results of ground and flight testing of existing and new Air Force aircraft. ARDU consists of three test and evaluation flights (TEFs) located at RAAF Bases Edinburgh, Amberley and Williamtown, staffed by qualified test pilots, flight test engineers (engineer graduates of test pilot school) and flight test system specialists (air combat officer graduates of test pilot school). Up until 2016 the Squadron also conducted flight test for the Australian Army with Army personnel also working within the unit.

The unit's flight test aircrew are long course trained at international test pilot schools including the United States Air Force Test Pilot School, the United States Naval Test Pilot School, the Empire Test Pilots' School, the École du personnel navigant d'essais et de réception and the National Test Pilot School.

The client base for ARDU encompasses the Air Mobility Group, Air Combat Group, Surveillance and Response Group, Air Force Training Group, and Defence Science and Technology Group.

ARDU often collaborates with sister AWC/TED unit Air Warfare Engineering Squadron (AWESQN). It also maintains close professional association with the other ADF flight test organisations, the Army Aviation Test and Evaluation Section (AATES) of the Army Aviation Training Centre (AAvnTC) located at Oakey, and the Navy's Aircraft Maintenance and Flight Trials Unit (AMAFTU) located at Nowra.

ARDU is now located at RAAF Base Edinburgh in Adelaide, South Australia, RAAF Base Williamtown near Newcastle, New South Wales, and RAAF Base Amberley near Brisbane, Queensland.

History
Originally the formation of the Special Duties and Performance Flight (SDPF) was established in December 1941 at Laverton, Victoria. The unit was reformed as No 1 Air Performance Unit (1 APU) in December 1943, the Unit was responsible for carrying out flight trials of new aircraft as well as aircraft modifications. During World War 2, flying trials included Spitfire, Beaufighter and Boomerang performance tests, as well as evaluations on various aircraft modifications including gun, radar and bombsight installations. In addition, the Unit carried out performance tests on captured Japanese 'Oscar' and 'Tony' fighters. Following the War the Unit was involved in tests on the CA-15 prototype, a Meteor Mk3, Lincoln bomber and De-Havilland Sea Hornet.

The unit was renamed Aircraft Research and Development Unit in September 1947, with detachments operating in Victoria, South Australia and New South Wales. In October 1948 ARDU moved back to Laverton with Detachment A at Mallalla, South Australia and Detachment B at Richmond, New South Wales and Detachment C at Edinburgh, South Australia.

By February 1977, all ARDU detachments had relocated to Edinburgh, South Australia, from where it continues its vital role of testing and evaluating both aircraft and weaponry in the RAAF inventory.

In 2003, ARDU was re-formed into the Aerospace Operational Support Group (AOSG) (which later became Air Warfare Centre (AWC)), which incorporated several additional operational support roles including those relating to flight test.

On 14 Jan 2013, ARDU established an outpost at Amberley, followed by Williamtown and Richmond. Richmond was ultimately absorbed by Amberley.

Commanding officers

Aircraft operated by the SDPF and 1 APU only 1941 to 1947 (Pre ARDU)

Spitfire (1944–1947)
Anson
Oxford
Norseman
Beaufort
Beaufighter
Boomerang (1943-1946)
Woomera (1942-1945)

Lancer (1943)
Shrike (1943–1944)
Hurricane (1943)
Hudson
Ventura
Liberator (1944-1947)

Fixed wing aircraft operated by ARDU

Wirraway (1943-1957)
Mustang (1944-19XX)
Mosquito (1944–51)
Lincoln (1947–1959)
Chipmunk VH-BFT (1948–1949)
Drover VH-DHA (1948–1949)
Meteor (1946–1956)
Dakota (1948–2000)
Sikorsky S-51 A80-1 (1948–1951)
Viking A82-1 (1948–1951)
Vampire (1948–1970)
Sea Hornet TT213 (1948–1951)
Freighter A81-1 (1949)
Winjeel A85-364 (1951–19XX)
Jindivik (1953–1955)
Prince A90-1 (1953–1954)
Beaver A95-201 (1955–1958)

Canberra (1954–1981)
Avro 707A WD280 (1956–1963)
Sabre (1955–1971)
Firefly T5 VX373 (1957)
Cessna 180 (1966–1967)
Mirage (1963–1988)
Macchi (1969–20XX)
CT-4 (1975–1993)
Nomad (1975–1991)
F/A-18 Hornet (1988–Present)
F-111C A8-132 (1996–2XXX)
King Air 200 VH-OYA (1999–20XX)
PC-9a (1999–Present)
KC-30A A39-003 (2011)
PC-21 (2018–Present)

Rotary wing aircraft operated by ARDU

Sycamore (1951–1954)
Kiowa (1971–20XX)
Iroquois (1977–2007)
Agusta A109E  (2010-2013)

Squirrel (1984–2006)
Black Hawk (1987–2013)
Tiger (2005–2010)

See also
MoD Boscombe Down
Air Force Test Center
Flight Test Society of Australia

References
 Air Force News Into the future
 RAAF Aeronautical Research and Development Unit

External links
Society of Experimental Test Pilots
Society of Flight Test Engineers
Flight Test Society of Australia

RAAF squadrons
Air force test units and formations
Military units and formations established in 1941